Welcome Home is the debut solo album by Backstreet Boys member Brian Littrell. The album was released on May 2, 2006 on Sony BMG and Christian music label Reunion Records. The album peaked on the Billboard 200 at number 74, and at number 3 on the Christian Albums chart. Four singles have been released from the album: "Welcome Home (You)", which charted at number one on the Christian Songs chart, and won Best Video of the Year of Dove Award. The album had sold over 100,000 copies in US as of April 2007.

Recording
For a long time, Littrell had wanted to record Christian music—what he calls "pop positive" music. His first solo album, Welcome Home, was released on May 2, 2006, which, like the Backstreet Boys projects, is a Sony BMG release. The album peaked at number 74 on the Billboard 200 and number 3 on the Christian charts, and has sold over 100,000 copies. Three singles were released from the album. The first, "Welcome Home (You)", reached number 2 on the US Christian charts and number one on Reach FM's Top 40 chart and the R&R Christian Inspirational Chart, staying there for three weeks. The second single was "Wish" and, in 2007, the third single, "Over My Head", was released. During this time, he maintained his duties as a member of the Backstreet Boys. In the summer of 2005, his solo single, "In Christ Alone", went to number one on the Christian charts on July 4.

Littrell was a winner of the 2006 GMA Dove Award for Inspirational Recorded Song of the Year for "In Christ Alone" (along with songwriters Don Koch and Shawn Craig). In the next few years he would win three more Doves for collaboration projects; in 2008, Special Event Album of the Year for Glory Revealed (various artists) and the Inspirational Recorded Song of the Year for "By His Wounds", from that album; and in 2010, Special Event Album of the Year for Glory Revealed II.

Critical reception
Stephen Thomas Erlewine of AllMusic said of the album; "If Welcome Home is just judged on its sonic merits, it would be hard to distinguish this album from many other slick, sweet contemporary Christian releases, but it stands out from the pack for one simple reason: it's the solo debut album from Brian Littrell, one of the five members of the Backstreet Boys. Breaking away from that mega-successful boy band, Littrell has decided to revamp his image, if not entirely his sound, by dedicating himself to Christian music. Since many modern CCM albums aren't that far removed, at least in production terms, from mainstream pop, it's an easy transition for Littrell, and Welcome Home would be equally at home on either CCM or adult contemporary radio, since its smooth, polished surfaces go down easily. There's a preponderance of ballads here, balanced by the occasional surging anthem like "I'm Alive" and insistent pop tunes like "My Answer Is You", but there's not a great distance between these extremes. All the songs blend together pleasantly, and if no individual song particularly distinguishes itself—the smooth jazz vibe of "We Lift You Up" comes the closest—they do all fit together to make a comforting, relaxing listen that establishes Littrell as a credible CCM vocalist, even if it doesn't necessarily go a long way to establish a distinctive musical personality of his own."

Track listing

Personnel
Adapted credits from the liner notes of Welcome Home.

Vocals
Lead vocals – Brian Littrell
Background vocals – Elicia Brown, Luke Brown, Janice Corder, Lakisha Frierson, Mark Kibble, Brian Littrell, Kimberely Mont, Tony Osborne-Varnell, Chandra Penix, Kevin Stancil, San Stancil, David Thomas, Keisha Williams

Instruments
Bass – Chuck Butler, Chris Kent, Brent Milligan, Chris Rojas
Drums – J. J. Hodges, Dan Needham
Guitars – Chuck Buter, Basil Fung, Adam Lester (add.), Billy Mann, Chris Rojas
Keyboards – Billy Mann, Chris Rojas, Roger A. Ryan
Strings – David Angell, David Davidson, Carole Rabinowitz, Roger A. Ryan, Kris Wilkinson

Production
Assistant engineer – Travis Daniels, Kenneth Mount
Drum programming – Jason Gaines, Chris Rojas
Engineering – Steve Bishir, Mark Kibble, Billy Mann, Skye McCaskey, Dan Muckala, Chris Rainwater, Chris Rojas
Mastering – Andrew Mendelson ("Jesus Loves You")
Mixing – Drew Douthit, Jeremy Luzier, Marcelo Pennell, F. Reid Shippen
Mixing assistant – Lee Bridges, Steve Lotz
Producer – Mark Kibble, Billy Mann, Dan Muckala, David Thomas
Production assistant – Michael Head
Track programming – Chuck Butler ("I'm Alive")
Vocal arrangement – Mark Kibble, Brian Littrell, David Thomas ("Jesus Loves You")

Charts

References

2006 debut albums
Brian Littrell albums
Reunion Records albums